Tavros (which means "bull"), is a suburb in the southwestern part of the Athens agglomeration, Greece. Since the 2011 local government reform it is part of the municipality Moschato-Tavros, of which it is a municipal unit.

Geography

Tavros is situated 3 km southwest of Athens city centre, 3 km west of the Acropolis of Athens and 5 km northeast of Piraeus. The municipality has an area of 2.125 km2. Its built-up area is continuous with those of Central Athens and the neighbouring suburbs. The main thoroughfare is Peiraios Street, the old road from Athens center to Piraeus. Tavros has a metro station (Tavros – Eleftherios Venizelos metro station).

History
In the ancient times, the area of Tavros was part of the vast Athenian municipality of Eleonas, extending from Parnitha to the Phallic Breeze, was sparsely populated with few peasant inhabitants whose main occupation was the cultivation of the olive from which it took its name, Tavros was in NA area of the ancient municipality of Eleonas. The cultivation of the olive continued throughout the Ottoman domination until the middle of the 19th century and the area of Tavros continued to be overwhelmingly covered by olive groves. In the middle of the 19th century many farmers began to create vineyards and orchards instead of olive groves, but the settlement was always of an agricultural nature until the refugees after the 1920s created the present suburb.

The first inhabitants of the new settlement of Tavros were refugees from Asia Minor who came to the region with the contribution of then Prime Minister Eleftherios Venizelos. The refugees, a few years after their arrival in the area in 1926, as people who were very active in sport, founded the football association Fostiras, which soon emerged as one of the largest football clubs in Attica.

Until 1934, the present Tavros was part of the municipality of Athens and then it was detached as an autonomous community called Nea Sfageia. In 1972 Nea Sfageia became a municipality and renamed to Tavros by refugee residents as a reminder of their place of origin, the mountain range of the Tavros in Asia Minor.

The Asia Minor refugees built a number of churches and chapels such as Saint George in the center of the city, where they transported pieces of relics of St. Demetrius and Saint Nestor as well as the miraculous icon of St. Demetrius of Myrovlistos from the district of Derk in Istanbul. The sacred temple of the Crucified is also at the center a little further north of the OSE lines, erected in 1960 and celebrated every 14 September at the Feast of the Holy Cross, feasts around the temple site. The Temple of the Crucified is known for its many charitable activities. Also the Minorite refugees brought from Antalya the icon of Panagia Attaliotissa or Jigo-Panagia as they called it and placed it from 1929 in the Holy Temple of the Assumption of the Blessed Virgin, built on the initiative of the Association of Atheliots and Alaiots. The feast of "Jigo-Panagia" in Tavros, Athens, takes place each year on the Myriopheras Sunday as well as in Antalya, Asia Minor.

The new inhabitants replaced the olives and the vineyards with vegetable gardens, after the 1950s due to the great industrial development and the proximity to Rentis and Vegetables quickly developed into an industrial area. In 1975, a ministerial order banned livestock farming in the area, since then the settlement was converted into industrial but is still sparsely populated with housing. Keeping the stream of Prophet Elijah allows the Tavros area to retain some elements from its old character. Many churches like Zoodochos Pigi have been built very close to the stream.

Sports
Tavros hosts the clubs Fostiras F.C. with earlier presence in A Ethniki and Ajax Tavrou with earlier presence in Delta Ethniki

Historical population

Notable people 
Maria Dimitriadi (1951–2009), singer

See also
List of municipalities of Attica

References

External links
Stadia.gr - Tavros

Populated places in South Athens (regional unit)